Paul Wong Koon-chung (born 黃貫中; 31 March 1964), known professionally as Paul Wong, is a Hong Kong musician, singer, songwriter and record producer. He achieved fame in Asia as the lead guitarist of the rock band Beyond until the band disbanded in 2005. After the lead vocalist Wong Ka Kui's death Paul Wong became the lead vocalist and main songwriter for Beyond. He also earned the award "The Best Rock Singer" in Hit Awards in 2012.

Biography

1964–2005: Early life and Beyond
Paul Wong was born on 31 March 1964, growing up with father, mother and two younger brothers in Kowloon City. Still, his mother later lived separately from her husband and children as his parents divorced.

As a juvenile he was the champion at a couple of art contests. Until he majored in design at Hong Kong Polytechnic College, he was invited by drummer Yip Sai Wing to handle a design project for Beyond's first concert. Later he became friends with them as well as a member replacing the former lead guitarist Chan Sze On. While he worked as a designer at an advertising company, he was meantime in progress of several pieces of design work, such as the envelope design of cassette Goodbye Ideals (1986) and clothing design of Contact of Life Concert (1991).

Regarding his vocal contribution to Beyond, he started off as the lead vocalist singing the lead on "Midnight Stray" (1988). In the same year he later provided lead vocals on "The Ground", one of the band's big hits. Besides, he began to play roles at different television series, including Two of a Kind featuring Hacken Lee and Wong on the leading roles.

On 30 June 1993 the mainstay of Beyond Wong Ka Kui was deceased. Thereafter the remaining three members switched to Rock Records making the band's next album The 2nd-Floor Flat (1994). After Wong Ka Kui's death, Paul Wong and Wong Ka Keung became the band's primary songwriters. In circa 1999, the media told that Paul Wong and Wong Ka Keung had discorded due to the difference between their musical ideas. Beyond in 2003 resumed conducting the concerts Beyond Beyond Beyond Live. Still, they held the band's final and break-up concerts Beyond The Story Live in 2005.

1999–present: Solo career
In late 1999, Wong launched his work as a solo singer while Beyond was taking a break. He formed the band Hann consisting of Jun Kung, Mak Man Wai (member of LMF) and Dino Acconci from the band Soler. Later on Wong established his own studio Polar Bear Studio. Afterward he signed a contract with Universal Records and then released Yellow Paul Wong (2001) and Black White (2001) in order. By these two albums, he won "The Gold Award as a Singer-songwriter" in Ultimate Song Chart Awards Presentation (2001 & 2002).

Wong showed his interest in musicals. In 2000 he played the protagonist Tony in the musical The Dream Broken in Victoria Harbour by troupe Theatre Space. The story was adapted from a broadway musical West Side Story, which was localised and whose background was moved to Hong Kong. At the performances, local conductor Henry Shek took the lead and played with Hong Kong New Philharmonic Symphonic Orchestra as all performers at the seashore of Hong Kong Cultural Centre.

In November 2002 Wong held his debut concert Play It Loud in Hong Kong Coliseum. After the contract with Universal had ended, he issued an album Existence (2004), where he invested in by himself.

In 2005 by the dissolution of Beyond, they ran eight sessions of Beyond The Story Live 2005 at Hong Kong Coliseum, which is the band's last world tour. Consequently, he worked as the musical supervisor for the musical Akapi Shooting Incident by Commercial Radio Hong Kong, in which Sammy Leung and Kitty Yuen engaged and Wong also wrote a few soundtracks.

In April 2006, Wong signed a contract with Chinese Warner Records to explore the market of the Mainland China. In October he conducted solo concerts at Hong Kong Coliseum, namely Paul Wong Hong Kong Concert 2006: The Music of Madman's Study.

Discography

Solo albums and EPs

Songs for artists

Filmography

References

External links
Beyond Music
Hong Kong Vintage Pop Radio – Beyond
Ovation

Alumni of the Hong Kong Polytechnic University
Beyond (band) members
1964 births
Living people
Lead guitarists
20th-century Hong Kong male singers
21st-century Hong Kong male singers
Hong Kong rock guitarists
Hong Kong Cantopop singers
Hong Kong Mandopop singers
Hong Kong male singer-songwriters
Hong Kong record producers
Hong Kong male film actors
Hong Kong male television actors
Hong Kong Christians
Hong Kong designers